Zagreus is a 2003 Big Finish Productions audio drama based on the long-running British science fiction television series Doctor Who. This audio drama was presented on three compact discs, and was made by Big Finish as their primary release to celebrate forty years of Doctor Who. As of February 2015, it is being sold as a download.

Plot

Following directly from the events of Neverland, the casket of anti-time which was destined for Gallifrey had exploded within the confines of the TARDIS. It seems that the Eighth Doctor and Charley have saved Gallifrey, and that the paradox of Charley's existence had been resolved, but the Doctor begins behaving strangely — he has been taken over by Zagreus.

The Doctor/Zagreus rages through the TARDIS and strikes Charley, but there is a loud explosion, and when they recover the Doctor/Zagreus is alone in the TARDIS. Charley finds herself in Harley Street talking to her mother Lady Louisa Pollard, who mentions amongst other out of place information that one of her sisters is called Romana. Charley is taken to see a Dr Zagreus, and her mother turns into a white rabbit from Alice's Adventures in Wonderland.  Charley then meets someone whom she recognises as the Brigadier.

The Doctor/Zagreus, unsure of his true identity, stumbles into a TARDIS library. He hears a mysterious voice in the TARDIS, that of one of his previous incarnations, the Third Doctor. The Brigadier tells Charley that everything she has seen is a holographic projection created by the TARDIS. She is then shown scenes from her own memory to provide her with insight into what has happened to the Doctor.

The Doctor leaves the library through a secret passage and finds a part of the TARDIS unaffected by the anti-time infection, from where he is able to converse with Zagreus. Zagreus shows him all possible alternate time lines, including universes where the Doctor plucked out one of his own hearts, and tells the Doctor that he would destroy all of them if he was unleashed.

Charley and the Brigadier find themselves in another holographic projection, this time a 1950s army barracks. Charley realises that the Brigadier is also a hologram, created by the TARDIS. The Brigadier mentions something called "The Divergence" and says that the Time Lords would not be able to intervene lest they become infected with the anti-time. In the TARDIS, the Doctor hears the Third Doctor's voice again and finds a book The Alice Compendium in which he reads Charley's name and the phrases "the divergence" and "Nana Saviltride".

Charley and the Brigadier realise the projection is of Cardington, where the R101 was launched in 1930. There, a Doctor Stone is conducting an experiment, which causes a huge explosion. The Doctor hears the explosion and rushes to the TARDIS control room, but finds himself instead in a forest. There he encounters a huge talking Cat and a large metal box. The Cat tricks the Doctor into entering the box and seals him in with a cyanide bottle, which is a Schrödinger's cat demonstration. The Doctor realises the meaning — if he left the TARDIS he would become either fully himself or fully Zagreus.

At Cardington, Stone argues with the base chaplain Matthew Townsend about his research. Townsend expresses reservations about possible military applications of Stone's research, and wonders about the course of human evolution. Charley overhears Stone talking about the military application of "Dionysus" — the code name of her project. It had torn a hole in reality, which might be used as a weapon. Miss Foster, who had told Charley and the Brigadier that she was a military secret agent, tries to plant a bomb on the Dionysus project; she was in fact a spy for communist Cuba. Threatening to kill them all, Foster forces Townsend to operate the machine, creating another rift in time. All but Charley and Townsend are sucked into the rift; on the other side of the rift are creatures trying to break through.

On ancient Gallifrey, the Great Mother, Cassandra, Provost Tepesh and Lady Ouida discuss why their groups despise Rassilon. Rassilon has destroyed followers of the Great Mother's religion, and Tepesh is of the Arcalian chapter whom Rassilon has hunted nearly to extinction. Combined, they plan to attack Rassilon's Foundry, his secret base. Charley and Brigadier are between holographic projections. They discuss what they saw at Cardington, creatures from outside of the boundaries of time and space trying to break through. Charley wonders aloud whether she could take the Doctor's place by absorbing Zagreus into her, allowing the Doctor to go free.

The Doctor is beginning to unravel the mystery. The Cat is another avatar of the TARDIS. The Doctor's being in the forest was to protect him from events elsewhere. He realises "Saviltride" is an anagram of "evil TARDIS", from which he deduces that not only was his only personality split in two, so was that of the TARDIS. Tepesh and the Great Mother enter Rassilon's Foundry where they meet Charley, however they perceive her as being Rassilon. Cassandra says something which offends Tepesh, and he orders Ouida to kill her and drink her blood. She cannot regenerate as Rassilon was still in the early stages of the genetic experimentation into the Time Lord gift. When an automated system reveals some of Rassilon's secrets, Charley discovers that Rassilon, fearing for the survival of the Time Lords, created self-replicating biogenic molecules and sent them back in time. The effect of these molecules was to ensure that all life-forms in the universe evolved to something approximating the Gallifreyan norm. To prevent creatures from the Divergence entering our universe, he then sealed time into a loop.

The Dionysus Project that Charley saw at Cardington had breached the loop, allowing creatures from the Divergent universe to enter ours. Tepesh reveals that the Vampires had only drunk the blood of specially bred animals, but Rassilon's purges forced them to drink the blood of intelligent species in order to survive. He refrains from attacking Charley/Rassilon until he has discovered  all the Foundry's secrets. The automated recorder reveals the Foundry draws its power from the Divergent universe. When the Brigadier advises Charley to switch off the power, this allows creatures from the Divergence to break through. The Great Mother reveals that Rassilon stole the secret of regeneration from the Vampires, and that much of Time Lord technology was stolen from the Divergent universe. The Foundry's defences seal off the whole base and prepare to fire storm it to prevent the escape of the Divergent creatures. The Brigadier and Charley escape through a mirror, but Tepesh, Ouida and the Great Mother are killed.

Charley finds herself within another scenario, and this time her appearance is that of a  mouse in battle armour. She is in some sort of bizarre theme park where animatronic animals are battling with animatronic humans. The Doctor meanwhile is fighting against the TARDIS, destroying parts of its architecture. The Brigadier arrives, and is revealed to be an avatar of the TARDIS's Zagreus personality. To defend the TARDIS, the Brigadier summons a Jabberwock, and the Doctor flees. Charley encounters Goldilocks, the leader of the enemy humans. They are fighting to get control of the Animator, but both sides wish to release from suspended animation so they do so. The Animator, Uncle Winky, was suspended in the year 2367. To his horror, he discovers he has been in suspended animation for 60 billion years and has awoken on the dead world of Gallifrey, which the theme park was moved to. They are on what was once the Foundry, and the animatronic creatures have fallen under the influence of the Divergence creatures. They revived Winky to operate the controls of the Foundry machines, but he dies of the heart condition which he had entered suspended animation to survive.

Having escaped the Jabberwock, the Doctor now plucks Charley out of the simulation. Charley is unable to trust the Doctor as he had hit her earlier, and she no longer trusts the Brigadier avatar. Rassilon himself appears and reveals that after the explosion, the Doctor and Charley had been unconscious for six months, in which time Rassilon had persuaded the TARDIS to aid him in exchange for freeing it from the Doctor/Zagreus's influence. On Gallifrey, Cardinal Braxiatel informs Romana that the Doctor's TARDIS has dematerialised of its own accord. Leela then arrives with a message from Rassilon concerning the fate of the Doctor.

Charley finds herself in a bleak landscape, together with Townsend, Tepesh and Winky. Ahead of them they see a Dark Tower — they are in the Death Zone on Gallifrey.

Romana, Leela and K-9 transmat to Rassilon's tomb within the dark tower. Rassilon's spirit speaks through Leela, and leads them to a Matrix simulation of the Dark Tower in ancient times. Meanwhile, Charley informs Townsend, Tepesh and Winky that they are Zagreus's recreations of the Fifth, Sixth and Seventh Doctors, and also the only people to have ever seen the Divergence. Charley tried to persuade them to go to the Dark Tower, but Tepesh is reluctant to play the Game of Rassilon. The Jabberwock then appears, but they subdue it by reciting nonsense poetry, using it to fly them into the Dark Tower.

Rassilon demands that Romana resign from the presidency in favour of Zagreus. When she refuses, Rassilon uses the possessed Leela to attack Romana and K-9, whose head gets knocked off. The Jabberwock crashes into the Dark Tower, but Charley and the recreated Doctors make their way inside. Their passage is blocked by a booby-trapped chessboard and hear a riddle from Rassilon. The Doctors think the answer is related to the number pi, but upon crossing Winkle is nearly hit by a bowspike. Instead Charley deduces that they must move across using the knight's move in chess. They find Leela attacking Romana, and Charley knocks her unconscious.

Rassilon and the Brigadier avatar have chained up the Doctor and are preparing to torture him. When the Doctor asks about Charley, the avatar flies into a rage, ranting about how the TARDIS had suffered in its many adventures with the Doctor, especially its recent absorption of anti-time to save Charley. The Doctor realises the TARDIS is jealous of Charley. Rassilon summons the Doctor and the Brigadier into the Foundry, which he proudly declares to be the place where he created the Nemesis and the De-mat gun. Rassilon shows them a frozen solar system — one which housed a species which could have threatened the Time Lords. The Brigadier avatar destroys the police box shell of the TARDIS in the Foundry's smelting works.

From the Dark Tower, Romana, Charley, the Doctors and a K-9 find a secret entrance to the Foundry through the mirror. Townsend cracks a code in Old High Gallifreyan, proving they were created from the Doctor's memories and thus retain some elements of his knowledge. Pushing past the Brigadier, they find the Doctor by an anvil creating a sword from the molten TARDIS shell. Rassilon believes that he has destroyed the Doctor's sanity thus allowing Zagreus full control.  The Doctor's other aspects tell him Rassilon is manipulating him as a weapon against the creatures of the Divergent universe, as the creatures of the Divergent Universe would have evolved to surpass the Time Lords before Rassilon locked them away. Rassilon seizes the anti-time sword and slays all the Doctors but the Eighth. Charley, Romana and Leela try to avoid being shot by the Brigadier and Romana transports him into the crucible.

The Doctor gives the anti-time sword to Charley, and begs her to kill him before Zagreus takes over. Charley cannot kill him for she loves him, but when the Doctor tells her that he does not love her, she pierces him with the sword before breaking down in tears. The Doctor does not regenerate, however; when Rassilon killed Townsend, Tepesh and Winkle those parts of him were removed, and when Charley stabbed him they were restored saving him from death. It is Zagreus who awakens, but when Rassilon commands him to enter the Divergent universe to slay the creatures, Zagreus instead throws Rassilon into the Divergence to face his fate, refusing to be Rassilon's puppet. Zagreus prepares to attack the Doctor's companions, but the Brigadier arrives and overpowers him. In the crucible, the TARDIS had been restored. Now free from the anti-time infection, the Brigadier avatar gives Zagreus a "drink me" potion which purges the Zagreus influence from the Doctor.

The Doctor tells Charley that she must leave him — the zero matter in the "drink me" potion has stabilised him, but he is still infected by anti-time. He intends to travel to the Divergent universe to quarantine himself forever and protect the universe from the anti-time infection. Charley storms out of the TARDIS, whereupon Romana speaks to the Doctor telling him that he will never be allowed to return and the Time Lords will prevent him from doing so if he tries. Romana leaves the TARDIS and it dematerialises. Romana asks Leela where Charley is, and Leela asks Romana if she was aware that the TARDIS had a back door. Leela asks if Romana still finds her stupid and Romana says this could be the beginning of a beautiful friendship.

The Doctor prepares for his new life in the Divergent universe, excited by the prospect of seeing new worlds and new people. He is not yet aware that Charley will be seeing them with him ...

Cast

Jon Pertwee as the Third Doctor
Peter Davison as the Fifth Doctor and Reverend Matthew Townsend
Colin Baker as the Sixth Doctor and Provost Tepesh
Sylvester McCoy as the Seventh Doctor and Walton "Uncle Winky" Winkle
Paul McGann as the Eighth Doctor and Zagreus
India Fisher as Charley
Lalla Ward as Romana
Louise Jameson as Leela
Don Warrington as Rassilon
Nicholas Courtney as TARDIS
Anneke Wills as Lady Louisa Pollard
 Stephen Perring as Receptionist
Elisabeth Sladen as Miss Lime
 Conrad Westmaas as the Cat
Mark Strickson as Captain Neil MacDonell
Sarah Sutton as Miss Foster
Nicola Bryant as Stone and Ouida
Caroline Morris as Mary Elson
Maggie Stables as the Great Mother
Bonnie Langford as Cassandra and Goldilocks
Robert Jezek as the Recorder
Stephen Fewell as Corporal Heron
Sophie Aldred as Captain Duck
Lisa Bowerman as Sergeant Gazelle
Miles Richardson as Cardinal Braxiatel
John Leeson as K-9

Continuity 
As well as featuring in Neverland, the name Zagreus had already cropped in several earlier audio plays. The Sixth Doctor hummed the Zagreus sits inside your head rhyme in Project: Twilight, and in Omega, a hologram of the legendary Time Lord was featured. Death sang a paraphrased version of the rhyme in Master. Zagreus was also briefly mentioned in the BBC novel Instruments of Darkness by Gary Russell.
 The delirious Doctor/Zagreus mentions John William Polidori; continuing the running joke references to a previous adventure (or adventures) at Lake Geneva, during the winter when Mary Shelley wrote Frankenstein. The story is finally told in the "Mary's Story" segment of The Company of Friends.
Romana and Leela's story continues in the Gallifrey series. Polidori and his friends appear in the 2020 episode The Haunting of Villa Diodati.
Cardinal Braxiatel (Miles Richardson) had earlier appeared in several Bernice Summerfield audio dramas and would later become a regular character in the Gallifrey audio series.

Notes
Jon Pertwee's surprise posthumous cameo was facilitated by the use of recordings he had made for a fan film called Devious, a finale for Season 6B
This story features nearly all of the Doctor and companion actors who had worked with Big Finish up to this point, although most of them do not play their usual roles. The characters played by Peter Davison, Colin Baker and Sylvester McCoy are eventually revealed to be projections partly based on the TARDIS's memories of the past Doctors. The three do appear briefly as the Doctor near the end of the story, when the Eighth Doctor is (temporarily) killed and meets his former selves in his mind. A similar occurrence happened when the Seventh Doctor's mind was taken over by the Timewyrm in the Virgin New Adventure Timewyrm: Revelation, and the Doctor met all his previous selves, bar the Second Doctor (whom he met in Timewyrm: Apocalypse) and the Sixth Doctor.
This was the only audio drama in which Peter Davison, Colin Baker, Sylvester McCoy and Paul McGann all appear until the 2010 story, The Four Doctors.
There are many in-joke references in the work to incidents in the lives of the characters of the companions or of the actors who played them. For example, Goldilocks, played by Bonnie Langford, is in control of a fairy which she commands through poetic couplets. This is a reference to the fact that Bonnie was starring in a stage production of Peter Pan at the time of being cast as Mel.
Peter Davison, Paul McGann, Nicholas Courtney and India Fisher are the only actors to appear in all three segments of the story (Wonderland, Heartland and Wasteland).
 The Doctor reading from Frankenstein is a partial continuation of a running joke in Eighth Doctor audio dramas about him being involved with Mary Shelley, which began in Storm Warning and ended in "Mary's Story".

Footnotes
 A reference to events in the Eighth Doctor Adventures. This is the first indication in the audio dramas that they take place in an alternate universe to that of the book series. Likewise, he makes reference to "Standing on a planet called Oblivion, facing down a race known as the Horde". This event took place in the comic strips published in Doctor Who Magazine.
 Dionysus is also known by the name Zagreus in Greek mythology.
 This is probably the same religion featured in the Old Time sequences of the New Adventure Cat's Cradle: Time's Crucible. Given the references to disguised science and youth potions, it is also almost certainly the Sisterhood of Karn.
 Another reference to the Cat's Cradle trilogy.

References

External links
Big Finish Productions – Zagreus
The Legend of Zagreus – from the DiscContinuity Guide.

2003 audio plays
Third Doctor audio plays
Fifth Doctor audio plays
Sixth Doctor audio plays
Seventh Doctor audio plays
Eighth Doctor audio plays
Doctor Who multi-Doctor stories
Holography in fiction
Gallifrey audio plays